"Mafia" is a song by Bosnian rappers Jala Brat and Buba Corelli. It was released on 15 April 2018 as a single from their third studio album Alfa & Omega produced by their record label Imperia. The song was written by Jala Brat and Buba Corelli. It was produced and recorded at Imperia Studios in Sarajevo, Bosnia and Herzegovina.

Music video
The music video was directed and produced by Dino Šehić and Esmir Šabić and premiered 15 April 2018. Within the first 24 hours the video was viewed more than a million times on YouTube.

References

External links
Mafia at Discogs

2018 singles
2018 songs